El Arenal may refer to the following places:

Argentina
El Arenal, Santiago del Estero, a municipality and village in Santiago del Estero

Mexico
El Arenal, Hidalgo, a town and municipality in the state of Hidalgo
El Arenal, Jalisco, a town and municipality in the state of Jalisco

Nicaragua
El Arenal Natural Reserve, a natural reserve in the Matagalpa department

Spain
El Arenal, Ávila, a municipality in the province of Ávila, Castile and León
El Arenal, Seville, a neighbourhood in the municipality of Seville, Andalusia
s'Arenal, coastal area in Mallorca, Balearic Islands

See also
Arenal (disambiguation)